The 1958–59 Minneapolis Lakers season was the 11th season for the franchise in the NBA.

The Lakers would make it to the NBA Finals, only to be swept by the Boston Celtics in four games in their penultimate season in Minnesota.

Preseason

Draft picks

Regular season

Season standings

x - clinched playoff spot

Record vs. opponents

Game log

Playoffs

|- align="center" bgcolor="#ccffcc"
| 1
| March 14
| Detroit
| W 92–89
| Larry Foust (17)
| Minneapolis Auditorium
| 1–0
|- align="center" bgcolor="#ffcccc"
| 2
| March 15
| @ Detroit
| L 103–117
| Elgin Baylor (26)
| Detroit Olympia
| 1–1
|- align="center" bgcolor="#ccffcc"
| 3
| March 18
| Detroit
| W 129–102
| Elgin Baylor (30)
| Minneapolis Auditorium
| 2–1
|-

|- align="center" bgcolor="#ffcccc"
| 1
| March 21
| @ St. Louis
| L 90–124
| Elgin Baylor (21)
| —
| Kiel Auditorium
| 0–1
|- align="center" bgcolor="#ccffcc"
| 2
| March 22
| St. Louis
| W 106–98
| Elgin Baylor (33)
| Elgin Baylor (15)
| Minneapolis Auditorium
| 1–1
|- align="center" bgcolor="#ffcccc"
| 3
| March 24
| @ St. Louis
| L 97–127
| Baylor, Fleming (15)
| Elgin Baylor (8)
| Kiel Auditorium9,324
| 1–2
|- align="center" bgcolor="#ccffcc"
| 4
| March 26
| St. Louis
| W 108–98
| Elgin Baylor (32)
| —
| Minneapolis Auditorium
| 2–2
|- align="center" bgcolor="#ccffcc"
| 5
| March 28
| @ St. Louis
| W 98–97 (OT)
| Elgin Baylor (36)
| —
| Kiel Auditorium
| 3–2
|- align="center" bgcolor="#ccffcc"
| 6
| March 29
| St. Louis
| W 106–104
| Elgin Baylor (33)
| Boo Ellis (15)
| Minneapolis Auditorium10,179
| 4–2
|-

|- align="center" bgcolor="#ffcccc"
| 1
| April 4
| @ Boston
| L 115–118
| Elgin Baylor (34)
| Larry Foust (19)
| Boston Garden8,195
| 0–1
|- align="center" bgcolor="#ffcccc"
| 2
| April 5
| @ Boston
| L 108–128
| Vern Mikkelsen (24)
| Steve Hamilton (13)
| Boston Garden11,082
| 0–2
|- align="center" bgcolor="#ffcccc"
| 3
| April 7
| Boston
| L 110–123
| Larry Foust (26)
| Larry Foust (22)
| St. Paul Auditorium11,272
| 0–3
|- align="center" bgcolor="#ffcccc"
| 4
| April 9
| Boston
| L 113–118
| Elgin Baylor (30)
| Elgin Baylor (14)
| Minneapolis Auditorium8,124
| 0–4
|-

Awards and records
 Elgin Baylor, NBA Rookie of the Year Award
 Elgin Baylor, All-NBA First Team
 Elgin Baylor, NBA All-Star Game
 Dick Garmaker, NBA All-Star Game
 Larry Foust, NBA All-Star Game
 Elgin Baylor, NBA All-Star Game Most Valuable Player Award

References

Los Angeles Lakers seasons
Minneapolis
Minnesota Lakers
Minnesota Lakers